Worthington State Forest is a state forest located in Warren County, New Jersey within the Delaware Water Gap National Recreation Area, just north of the water gap in the Skylands Region of the state. The park offers hiking, camping (including a hike-in, primitive area) and canoeing and kayaking on the Delaware River. The park is operated and maintained by the New Jersey Division of Parks and Forestry.

History 
The forest is named after Charles Campbell Worthington, who, throughout the late 1800s, purchased  of land of both sides of the river, including parts of Mount Tammany. His intent was to create one of the premier deer hunting preserves in the county. He would name this estate Buckwood Park.

He built Buckwood Lodge, a small mansion on the side of Kittatinny Ridge, between the river and Sunfish Pond, a small lake higher up the ridge covering . Worthington gave Sunfish Pond the name of Buckwood Lake, and used it as a water supply for his lodge.

The Old Mine Road, one of the earliest roads in the area, runs along the Delaware; it was used for transporting copper and slate from nearby mines and quarries, and is believed to have originally been a Native American trail that saw use by fur traders and Dutch settlers.

Area 
The forest includes the  Dunnfield Creek Natural Area; the creek is designated a wild trout stream. The  Sunfish Pond Natural Area consists of a glacial lake and the surrounding chestnut oak forest, and can be reached by a steep and rocky climb along the Appalachian Trail. At , Mount Tammany offers a view of the Delaware Water Gap.

See also

 Mount Tammany Fire Road
 Pahaquarry Copper Mine
 Appalachian Trail by state

References

External links
 New Jersey Skylands - area history
 NY-NJTC: Worthington State Forest

Delaware Water Gap
New Jersey state forests
Protected areas of Warren County, New Jersey
State forests of the Appalachians